Gongchang may refer to the following locations in China: 

Gongchang, Gansu (巩昌镇), town in Longxi County
Gongchang, Hubei, town in Jianli County, Jingzhou, Hubei